Singapore Petroleum Company Limited, in short SPC, is a Singaporean multinational oil and gas company. It is involved in the exploration and production of petroleum, refining, trading and petroleum product distribution.

History
The company was founded in 1969 as the Singapore Petroleum & Chemical Co. Pte Ltd and later changed its name to the Singapore Petroleum Company Ltd. The company is also a part owner of Singapore Refining Company Pte Ltd which was founded in 1979.

In 2004, SPC acquired 50% of BP's interest in the SRC and BP's retail network of 28 stations and LPG business in Singapore. In 2009, SPC was acquired by China's PetroChina from Keppel Corporation and was delisted from the Singapore Stock Exchange. In 2019, SPC changed its logo and went over a company overhaul. A new visual identity was introduced incorporating logo elements of PetroChina.

Exploration and Production
SPC's presence and profile in the regional E&P sector has grown with the acquisition of assets over the years. These assets include Block B in Cambodia, the Kakap Production Sharing Contract (PSC) and the Sampang PSC in Indonesia, Blocks 102 and 106, and Block 101-100/04 in Vietnam, Block T06-3 in Australia. In 2007, they expanded their assets to China with 3 additional blocks, 04/36 & 05/36 in Bohai Bay and Blk 26/28, offshore China.

In the pipeline business, SPC holds interests in three regional gas transmission pipelines. The 654-kilometre West Natuna Transportation System is the first Singapore cross border sub-sea gas pipeline carrying gas from the West Natuna Sea to Singapore. A consortium of PSC blocks in West Natuna including the Kakap PSC owns this pipeline.

The 468-kilometre Grissik-Batam-Singapore Pipeline is the second direct gas pipeline transmitting gas from Indonesia to Singapore. Gas to Singapore commenced in 2003 under a 20-year term contract between Singapore and Indonesia. The 536-kilometre Grissik-Duri Pipeline is a trunk line that transmit gas from the Grissik gas fields to Caltex's Duri facilities under long-term contracts that commenced in 1998.

Refining, Supply and Trading

Refining
SPC, with equal partner Chevron Corporation (who also owns Caltex), owns half of the  Singapore Refining Company (SRC) plant, a complex refinery capable of cracking crude oil.

The refining of crude oil to petroleum products remains central to the Group's operations. Given the complexity of its refining facilities, SPC is able to refine heavy, medium and light crudes. SPC buys crudes from some 13 countries with the bulk of its supplies coming from the Middle East. The API gravity of these crudes ranges from 18 (mostly heavy/sour crude) to 45 (mostly light/sweet crudes).

Supply
The Company owns a storage terminal for petroleum products at Pulau Sebarok to support its marine bunker operations and trading and marketing activities. The 220,000 cubic metres terminal consisting of 13 tanks is equipped with a deep water jetty up to 160,000 tonnes displacement.

Trading
The trading unit actively trades in a variety of distillate and residual products which include Naphtha, Gasoline, Automotive Diesel Oil, Jet Fuel and Fuel Oil.

The Aviation Sales unit markets and supplies aviation fuel to airlines at four international airports in Singapore, Hong Kong, Bangkok, and Taipei. SPC is a supplier of aviation fuel in the Asia-Pacific region.

The Distillates unit is responsible for the sales and trading of naphtha, motor gasoline (petrol), gasoil (diesel) and jet fuel (kerosene).

The Residue unit is responsible for fuel oil trading and marine sales activities. Fuel oil of various specifications, including standard bunker grades, is sourced directly from SRC as well as from the Group's extensive network of global oil traders.

Financial
Singapore Petroleum Company or SPC was delisted from the Singapore Exchange on 22 October 2009 when Chinese oil giant PetroChina completed its takeover of the Singapore firm.

References

External links
Official website
Additional Research Notes on SPC Limited

Oil and gas companies of Singapore
Energy companies established in 1969
Non-renewable resource companies established in 1969
Singaporean brands
Companies formerly listed on the Singapore Exchange
Singaporean companies established in 1969